John Pitzigaudes, his surname variously also given as Pitzigaudios (Πιτζιγαύδιος), Pitzogabdes (Πιτζογάβδης), and Pittigaudes (Πιττιγαύδης) by different Byzantine chroniclers, was a Byzantine official and envoy.

He is mentioned by Theophanes the Confessor, as well as the later chroniclers Symeon Logothetes, Patriarch Nikephoros I of Constantinople, Theodosius of Melitene, George Monachos, Kedrenos, Zonaras, and in Emperor Constantine VII's De administrando imperio. According to these accounts, he was of noble origin, a patrikios, and was highly experienced in political matters. Following the failed First Arab Siege of Constantinople he was sent, probably in 678, by Emperor Constantine IV, to conclude a peace treaty with the Umayyad caliph Mu'awiya I. According to Henry Yule, he is to be identified with the Byzantine envoy "Yenyo", who is mentioned in the Chinese Old Book of Tang as leading the negotiations with the Ta shi (the Arabs).

References

Sources 
 
 

7th-century Byzantine people
Byzantine diplomats
Patricii
Byzantine people of the Arab–Byzantine wars
7th-century diplomats